Aktash (Ak-Taş; , Aqtaş) is a rural locality (a selo) in Ulagansky District, the Altai Republic, Russia. The population was 2418 as of 2016. There are 24 streets.

Geography 
Aktash is located on the southern slope of Kuray Mountains, 55 km southwest of Ulagan (the district's administrative centre) by road. Chibit is the nearest rural locality.

References 

Rural localities in Ulagansky District